Lucas County is a county located in the U.S. state of Iowa. As of the 2020 census, the population was 8,634. The county seat is Chariton.
The county was formed in 1846 and was named for Robert Lucas, a Governor of the Territory.

Geography

Major highways
 U.S. Highway 34
 U.S. Highway 65
 Iowa Highway 14

Adjacent counties
Warren County  (northwest)
Marion County  (northeast)
Monroe County  (east)
Wayne County  (south)
Clarke County  (west)

Demographics

2020 census
There were 4,058 housing units, of which 3,608 were occupied.

2010 census
There were 4,238 housing units, of which 3,689 were occupied.

2000 census

As of the census of 2000, there were 9,422 people, 3,811 households, and 2,560 families residing in the county.  The population density was 22 people per square mile (8/km2).  There were 4,239 housing units at an average density of 10 per square mile (4/km2).  The racial makeup of the county was 98.44% White, 0.13% Black or African American, 0.11% Native American, 0.30% Asian, 0.01% Pacific Islander, 0.37% from other races, and 0.65% from two or more races.  0.87% of the population were Hispanic or Latino of any race.

There were 3,811 households, out of which 28.30% had children under the age of 18 living with them, 56.70% were married couples living together, 7.00% had a female householder with no husband present, and 32.80% were non-families. 28.70% of all households were made up of individuals, and 14.60% had someone living alone who was 65 years of age or older.  The average household size was 2.42 and the average family size was 2.98.

In the county, the population was spread out, with 25.40% under the age of 18, 7.30% from 18 to 24, 24.60% from 25 to 44, 23.40% from 45 to 64, and 19.30% who were 65 years of age or older.  The median age was 40 years. For every 100 females there were 94.50 males.  For every 100 females age 18 and over, there were 91.10 males.

The median income for a household in the county was $30,876, and the median income for a family was $38,352. Males had a median income of $31,243 versus $21,293 for females. The per capita income for the county was $15,341.  About 8.40% of families and 13.70% of the population were below the poverty line, including 19.10% of those under age 18 and 9.60% of those age 65 or over.

Athletics
Lucas County is well known for its baseball program.  As recently as 2009, Lucas County's Babe Ruth All-star teams have made it to, or past, the Iowa State Tournament. They have won 5 Babe Ruth State Titles, with the most recent coming in 2008. They have not, however, won any national titles.

Communities

Cities
Chariton
Derby
Lucas
Russell
Williamson

Townships

Benton
Cedar
English
Jackson
Liberty
Lincoln
Otter Creek
Pleasant
Union
Warren
Washington
Whitebreast

Unincorporated areas
Norwood

Population ranking
The population ranking of the following table is based on the 2020 census of Lucas County.

† county seat

Notable people
T. J. Hockenson, Detroit Lions tight end 2019
John L. Lewis, labor union

Politics

See also

National Register of Historic Places listings in Lucas County, Iowa
Lucas County Courthouse
Red Haw State Park

References

Further reading
 Franklin D. Mitchell. Locale and Universe: The Shared Story of the Heartland's Lucas County, Iowa, and the American Nation, 1846-2012 (Self-published, 2016). 480 pp online review

External links

 Lucas County Sheriff's Office

 
1846 establishments in Iowa Territory
Robert Lucas family
Populated places established in 1846